Love Tricky is the seventh studio album released by Ai Otsuka on 22 April 2015. It's her first studio album, that has not any single release prior release of the album. 
It was released in both a CD+DVD edition and a CD edition; if purchased through her official fan club is came with a bonus CD featuring remixes. The album was co-produced by Abe Noboru from Studio Apartment and presents a sound that is slightly more electronic than her older works.

The album reached #24 on the weekly Oricon chart, and it continued to rank for a total of three weeks.

Track listing
Track list from Ai's official website.

References

Ai Otsuka albums
Avex Group albums
2015 albums